Camila Carvalho (born 30 May 1981) is a Brazilian rower. She competed in the women's lightweight double sculls event at the 2008 Summer Olympics.

References

External links
 

1981 births
Living people
Brazilian female rowers
Olympic rowers of Brazil
Rowers at the 2008 Summer Olympics
Sportspeople from Brasília
21st-century Brazilian women